Parapsestis pseudomaculata is a moth in the family Drepanidae. It was described by Constant Vincent Houlbert in 1921. It is found in the Chinese provinces of Shaanxi, Gansu, Hubei, Hunan, Sichuan and Yunnan and in Myanmar.

References

Moths described in 1921
Thyatirinae
Moths of Asia